Thimmaipalle is a village in Keesara mandal of Ranga Reddy district in the Indian state of Telangana. As of the 2011 Census of India, it had a population of 1021.

References

Cities and towns in Ranga Reddy district